Tajamika Paxton or Taj Paxton is an American writer, director and producer. Her credits include writing, directing and producing A Fat Girl's Guide to Yoga, written and developed from her interest in yoga and a winner of NBCUniversal's Second Annual “Comedy Short Cuts” Diverse City Festival in 2007. She produced the films Green Dragon—which starred Forest Whitaker and Patrick Swayze and won a Humanitas Award—and Chasing Papi, with Sofía Vergara. She sat on Outfest's board of directors and served as GLAAD's liaison to Hollywood.

Early life 
Paxton was born in Los Angeles, California. Paxton's mother is Mablean Ephriam, who is known for the reality courtroom series Justice with Mablean Ephriam and who was a judge on Divorce Court.

Education 
Paxton is a graduate of Georgetown University's school of business.

Career 
Paxton appeared with her mother on TV One's Life After. She served as vice president of production of Forest Whitaker's Spirit Dance Entertainment production company and as an MTV Films creative executive and was on the development team for Election, 200 Cigarettes, Varsity Blues and The Wood.

She was a board member of the Outfest L.A. Gay and Lesbian Film Festival and was director of programming for Outfest Fusion as well as GLAAD's director of entertainment media. She is an advocate of yoga and serves on the board of the International Association of Black Yoga Teachers.

References

External links
 

20th-century American businesspeople
20th-century American writers
20th-century American women writers
21st-century American businesspeople
21st-century American writers
21st-century American women writers
African-American film directors
African-American film producers
African-American screenwriters
Screenwriters from California
Film producers from California
Living people
American media executives
Businesspeople from Los Angeles
Georgetown University alumni
American women television writers
Writers from Los Angeles
Film directors from Los Angeles
American television writers
20th-century American businesswomen
21st-century American businesswomen
20th-century African-American women writers
20th-century African-American writers
21st-century African-American women writers
21st-century African-American writers
1972 births